Biathlon is one of the sports featured at the Winter Youth Olympics. It has been part of the games since the inaugural edition in 2012.

Medal summaries

Boys' events

Sprint (7.5 km)

Pursuit (10 km)

Individual (12.5 km)

Girls' events

Sprint (6 km)

Pursuit (7.5 km)

Individual (10 km)

Mixed events

Mixed relay

Single mixed relay

Medal table
As of the 2020 Winter Youth Olympics.

See also
Biathlon at the Winter Olympics
Cross-country / Biathlon mixed relay at the 2012 Winter Youth Olympics

References

External links 
 Youth Olympic Games

 
Sports at the Winter Youth Olympics
Youth Olympics